Mersacidin decarboxylase   MrsD is an enzyme that catalyzes the oxidative decarboxylation of the C-terminal cysteine residue of mersacidin to an aminoenethiol residue, intermediate as the first step in the formation of the unusual amino acid S-[(Z)-2-aminovinyl]-methyl-D-cysteine with coenzyme FAD

References 

EC 4.1.1
Bacterial proteins